Sir William Anthony Bowater Russell (born 15 April 1965, London) is a British financier who served as the 692nd Lord Mayor of the City of London from 2019 to 2021.

Biography
Educated at Eton and Durham University, graduating B.A., Russell started his career in financial services at First Boston in 1987, and joined Merrill Lynch in 1992, working in Hong Kong, New York and London, before leaving in 2006 for public service.

Sheriff of the City of London for 2016–17, Russell was then elected Lord Mayor on 1 October 2019, taking office on 9 November 2019. 
In view of the global disruption to public life brought about by the COVID-19 pandemic, Russell was re-elected, on 29 September 2020, as Lord Mayor of London to serve a second term for 2021, the first Lord Mayor to serve more than one term since William Cubitt was re-elected in 1861. He is the fifth member of his family to have held this position.

Russell represents Bread Street Ward as Alderman on the City of London Corporation since 2013. 

Russell is a Court Assistant to the Haberdashers' Company, a Liveryman of the Feltmakers' and an Honorary Liveryman of the Paviors' Companies.  

He was knighted in the 2022 New Year Honours for services to "financial innovation, culture and wellbeing in the City of London, particularly during Covid-19". 

A keen cricketer, he is also a member of MCC, and remains a member of the Advisory Board of Innovate Finance, an independent not-for-profit membership organisation serving the global FinTech community.

Family
The only son of Anthony Russell, a stockbroker, he is in remainder to the family baronetcy, created for his great-great-uncle, Charles Russell, founder of the eponymous law firm.

His mother, Charlotte née Bowater, was from a Kentish family of paper packagers;
her father, Sir Ian Bowater GBE, was Lord Mayor of London for 1969–70, and his father Sir Frank Bowater, Lord Mayor for 1938–39. Russell is the fifth member of his family to hold the position of Lord Mayor of London.

British actor Damian Lewis is his maternal half-brother.

In 1989, Russell married Hilary Chaplin: they have four children.

Honours
  2022: Knight Bachelor 
  2019: Knight of the Most Venerable Order of St John

Arms

See also
 Lord Russell of Killowen
 Russell baronets

References

Additional reading
 Burke's Peerage & Baronetage
 Lord Mayor Russell's biography

1965 births
Living people
English people of Northern Ireland descent
People educated at Eton College
Alumni of Grey College, Durham
English Roman Catholics
English investment bankers
Merrill (company) people
Councilmen and Aldermen of the City of London
21st-century lord mayors of London
Sheriffs of the City of London
Knights of Justice of the Order of St John
Knights Bachelor